Jalanpur is a small village on the bank of the Damodar River in Bankura district, West Bengal, India. This village is just on the other side of Waria Railway station and DTPS. It is under the Banjora Gram Panchyat. It is the last village of Mejia Community development Bloc. In old days this village was once considered as the Sanskrit Learning Station.

Demography

References

Add References

External links
Jalanpur village at VillagesInIndia.in

Villages in Bankura district